Kamalpur Musa is a village in Hazro Tehsil of Attock District in 
Punjab Province of Pakistan.

References

Villages in Attock District